Little Nemo is the title character in a series of weekly comic strips that appeared in  newspapers from 1905 – 1914.

Little Nemo may also refer to:

 Little Nemo (band), a French rock band
 Little Nemo (1911 film), an American silent animated short
 Little Nemo: Adventures in Slumberland, a 1989 animated film loosely based on the comic strip
 Little Nemo: The Dream Master, a video game based on the animated film

See also
 Nemo (disambiguation)